Huggins Lake is a small lake north-northeast of Beaverkill in Delaware County, New York. It drains south via Huggins Hollow which flows into Beaver Kill. The lake was the site of Indian Ridge, a Boy Scout summer camp managed remotely by Camden County Council, New Jersey, and in operation between 1962 and 1985. Indian Ridge was considered a primitive camp, with no cabins or dining hall. The scouts and staff slept in wall tents: the only structure was a walk-in refrigerator, the concrete pad of which is still visible east of the outlet end of the lake.

See also
 List of lakes in New York

References 

Lakes of New York (state)
Lakes of Delaware County, New York